Dominick Moreno is an American politician, currently serving as a state legislator in Colorado. A Democrat, Moreno was elected to the 21st district of the Colorado Senate in 2016. He previously represented the 32nd district in the Colorado House of Representatives from 2012 to 2016.

Biography

Early life and education
Moreno was born and raised in Commerce City, Colorado, and earned a B.A. in American Government from Georgetown University. Coming from a working-class family, Moreno was able to afford tuition at the institution as a consequence of generous scholarships he received.  During his years at Georgetown, Moreno returned to Colorado to work in retail and the service sector.  He spent breaks abroad teaching English in northern Mexico in the village of Palmitas.  After graduation, Moreno moved back to Colorado and served for two years on the city council of Commerce City. In 2017, Moreno completed Harvard University's John F. Kennedy School of Government program for Senior Executives in State and Local Government as a David Bohnett LGBTQ Victory Institute Leadership Fellow.

Legislative career
Prior to his election to the state legislature, Moreno worked as a legislative aide to Ed Casso, his predecessor as the district's representative. He is openly gay, and became one of four LGBT members of the House of Representatives alongside Speaker of the House Mark Ferrandino, Representative Joann Ginal, Representative Paul Rosenthal and Representative Sue Schafer.

2012 election
In the 2012 general election, Moreno faced Republican challenger Paul Reimer. Moreno was elected by a wide margin of 67% to 28%.

School board service
In July 2018, Moreno was appointed to fill a vacancy in the Adams County School District 14 school board, filling out the term of a board member who resigned. Moreno is a graduate of schools in the district and continued to serve in the General Assembly.

References

External links

1985 births
21st-century American politicians
21st-century LGBT people
Democratic Party Colorado state senators
Gay politicians
Hispanic and Latino American state legislators in Colorado
LGBT Hispanic and Latino American people
LGBT state legislators in Colorado
Living people
Democratic Party members of the Colorado House of Representatives
People from Commerce City, Colorado